Pavel Borisovich Axelrod (25 August 1850 – 16 April 1928) was an early Russian Marxist revolutionary. Along with Georgi Plekhanov, Vera Zasulich, and Leo Deutsch, he was one of the members of the first organization of Russian Marxists, Emancipation of Labor. After the 2nd Congress of the Russian Social Democratic Labour Party, he was part of the Menshevik faction, with which he was identified until his death.

Early life and career
Pavel Axelrod was the son of a Jewish innkeeper. His parents lived in the Jewish poorhouse. He was forced to work for a living from a young age; though while still in his early teens, he produced his first political essay, on the condition of the Jewish poor in the Mogilev Region, in modern-day Belarus. At the age of 16, he discovered the writings of the German socialist Ferdinand Lasalle, which had a major influence on him. Later, he obtained a place at Kiev University, with financial help from wealthy Jews, and organised a political discussion group, based on the ideas of P.L.Lavrov.

In 1874, he was one among hundreds of idealistic students who left the cities to work among the peasants. When that experiment failed, he emigrated to Geneva, where he was converted to anarchism and joined a circle of Russians who followed the ideas of Mikhail Bakunin. He returned to Ukraine briefly later in 1875, joined the Land and Liberty (Земля и Воля) party. He devoted himself to propaganda work among factory workers in Kiev, where in 1879, he and Yakov Stefanovich, founded the Workers' Union of South Russia. Unlike other anarchist groups, as well as aiming for the eventual transformation of society on anarchist foundations, they also advocated immediate reforms such as democratic freedoms, shorter working hours etc.

The Union disintegrated when Axelrod moved to St Petersburg, at the time when Zemlya i Volya split over the issue of whether to assassinate the Tsar Alexander II. He was a founder the populist Black Repartition group, another of whose leading members was Georgi Plekhanov. Axelrod was a 'moderate' within the Russian revolutionary movement, with an instinctive dislike of revolutionary violence. In 1878, he warned against the possibility of the movement degenerating into Jacobinism. He was "indignant" when two members of Black Repartition, Elizaveta Kovalskaya and Nikolai Schedrin told him that they planned to kill a factory owner in Smolensk who locked his workers in the factory overnight, with a result that many of them were burned to death when the building caught fire. He argued in the journal Vol'noe Slovo that the Kiev pogrom was damaging to the proletariat.

Axelrod emigrated to Switzerland again in June 1880, remaining in exile for 37 years.

Family 
In 1875 in Geneva, Axelrod married his former private student Nadezhda Ivanovna Kaminer, daughter of Isaac Kaminer. A student himself, Axelrod was Kaminer's and her sister's tutor. Despite severe financial hardship during the first years, the marriage proved to be successful. They had three children: Vera (born 22 November 1875), Alexander (born 18 July 1879) and Sofia (born 14 November 1881). Nadezhda Ivanovna Axelrod-Kaminer died in 1906.

To provide income for his family while in exile, Axelrod raised milk cows and produced his own kind of buttermilk which he then would sell and deliver himself to his customers. Axelrod would argue politics over his milk cans. His home was a place of refuge for fugitives from Russia, who were fed there; some were fitted out with new clothes.

In the mid-1880s Axelrod established his own small company producing kefir. By the end of the 1890s, Axelrod's company had offices in Zurich, Geneva, and Basel, which provided steady income and allowed him to support revolutionaries. In 1908, Axelrod sold his company in exchange for the retirement payments to him from the new owner.

Marxist revolutionary
In Switzerland, in September 1883, Axelrod joined Plekhanov, Vera Zasulich and Leo Deutsch in Emancipation of Labor (Освобождение Труда), the first Russian Marxist group. He wrote several essays which laid out the differences between marxists and the traditional Russian populists, or Narodniks, who believed that a peasant revolution would overthrow the Russian monarchy and introduce socialism, bypassing capitalism - The Workers' Movement and Social Democracy (Рабочее движение и социальная демократия) (1885) and Letter to Russian workers on the movement for the liberation of the proletariat (Письма к русским рабочим об освободительном движении пролетариата) (1889).

In 1900, Axelrod, Plekhanov, and Zasulich joined with the younger revolutionary Marxists Julius Martov, Vladimir Lenin, and Alexander Potresov to form the editorial board of Iskra, a Marxist newspaper, from 1900 to 1903. When Iskra supporters split at the Second Congress of the Russian Social Democratic Labor Party in 1903, Axelrod sided with the Menshevik faction.

Originally, he was seen as the leader of the Mensheviks, before he ceded that position to the younger Martov. Axelrod fundamentally disagreed with Lenin's concept of the party as a disciplined organisation of professional revolutionaries who led the workers. He believed that the revolutionaries would eventually take instructions from organised labour, and during the 1905 revolution, he was the author of a proposal to hold a mass workers' conference. After that failure, his influence within the Menshevik party diminished, but he continued to be a spokesman for the Menshevik in international conferences, particularly after the outbreak of war in 1914, when he was part of the Russian delegation at the anti-war Zimmerwald Conference. 

In 1917, after the February Revolution, Axelrod returned to Russia. By then some Mensheviks had already joined Kerensky's Provisional Government and supported government war policy. Despite all his efforts, Axelrod failed to gain Mensheviks' support for a policy of immediate peace negotiations with the Central Powers. After the Bolshevik victory, which Axelrod called a "historical crime without parallel in modern history", he toured the world rallying socialist opposition to the Bolsheviks.

Death
Axelrod died in exile in Berlin in 1928.

References
 Abraham Ascher. Pavel Axelrod and the Development of Menshevism, Harvard University Press, 1972, 420p.

External links
 Pavel Axelrod Biography
 Axelrod, Pavel (1850-1928)
 Archive of Pavel Borisovič Aksel'rod Papers at the International Institute of Social History
 

1850 births
1928 deaths
People from Pochepsky District
People from Mglinsky Uyezd
Jewish Russian politicians
Jews from the Russian Empire
Russian Social Democratic Labour Party members
Mensheviks
Emigrants from the Russian Empire to Switzerland
Emigrants from the Russian Empire to Germany
Jewish socialists